Early parliamentary elections were held in Iceland on 18 and 19 October 1942. They were held after reforms were made to the electoral system following the July elections. The Independence Party emerged as the largest party in the Lower House of the Althing, winning 13 of the 35 seats.

Electoral reform
In the previous two elections in 1937 and July 1942 the Independence Party had received the most votes, yet had received fewer seats than the Progressive Party, which had received more than 10% less of the vote. However, following the July elections election, changes were made to the electoral system that reduced the over-representation of the Progressive Party. This involved introducing proportional representation to the two six-member constituencies and increasing the number of seats in Reykjavík where PR was already in use, lowering its effective threshold from 11.3% to 8.7%.

Whilst both parties received a similar number of votes as in July (the IP increased their vote tally by just 26, whilst the PP lost 164 votes), the Independence Party won two extra seats in the Lower House, whilst the Progressive Party lost four.

Results

References

Iceland
1942 10
Parliamentary
Iceland